Nathan Twining may refer to:
 Nathan F. Twining, United States Air Force general
 Nathan Crook Twining, United States Navy admiral